Helene Migerka (13 September 1867, Brno – 26 March 1928, Graz) was an Austrian poet and novelist.
She was a daughter of the Austrian feminist and writer Katharina Kämpffat (1844, Tilsit – 1922) and museologist Franz Migerka (1828–1915).

Her cousin was Otto Neurath.

She committed suicide in 1928.

Literary works 
 Gedichte, 1889
 Neue Gedichte, 1895
 Das Glück der Häßlichen und andere Skizzen und Satiren, 1913
 Der neue Besen, 1920

References

External links 
 
 

1867 births
1928 deaths
Writers from Brno
People from the Margraviate of Moravia
19th-century Austrian novelists
20th-century Austrian novelists
19th-century Austrian women writers
20th-century Austrian women writers
Austrian feminists
Austrian women novelists
Moravian-German people
Austrian people of Moravian-German descent
1928 suicides
Suicides in Austria